The 1998 Patriot League baseball tournament was held on May 2 and 3, 1998 to determine the champion of the Patriot League for baseball for the 1998 NCAA Division I baseball season.  The event matched the top three finishers of the six team league in a double-elimination tournament.  Regular season champion  won their second championship and advanced to a play-in round ahead of the 1998 NCAA Division I baseball tournament, where they lost to Monmouth in three games.  Luke Braham of Navy was named Tournament Most Valuable Player.

Format and seeding
The top three finishers by conference winning percentage from the league's regular season advanced to the tournament.  The top seed earned a first round by and the right to host the event.  The second and third seeds played an elimination game, with the winner meeting the top seed in a best-of-three series.

Results

References

Tournament
Patriot League Baseball Tournament
Patriot League baseball tournament
Patriot League baseball tournament